The 1999–2000 Primeira Liga was the 66th season of top-tier football in Portugal. The competition was renamed Campeonato Nacional da Primeira Liga (National Championship of the First League), Primeira Liga for short, after the Portuguese League for Professional Football took control of the two top nationwide leagues in 1999. It started on 20 August 1999 and ended on 14 May 2000. The league was contested by 18 clubs with Porto as the defending champions.

Sporting won their first Championship in 18 years (since 1981–82) and qualified for the 2000–01 UEFA Champions League first group stage, along with Porto, who qualified for the third
qualifying round. Benfica, Boavista, qualified for the UEFA Cup; in opposite, Vitória de Setúbal, Rio Ave and Santa Clara were relegated to the Segunda Liga. Mário Jardel was the top scorer with 38 goals.

Promotion and relegation

Teams relegated to Segunda Liga
Beira-Mar
Chaves 
Académica

Beira-Mar, Chaves and Académica, were consigned to the Liga de Honra following their final classification in 1998–99 season.

Teams promoted from Liga de Honra
Gil Vicente
Belenenses
Santa Clara

The other three teams were replaced by Gil Vicente, Belenenses and Santa Clara from the Liga de Honra.

Teams

Personnel and kits

Managerial changes

League table

Results

Top goalscorers

References

External links
1999–2000 Primeira Liga at Infordesporto 
Portuguese League 1999/00 - footballzz.co.uk

Primeira Liga seasons
Port
1999–2000 in Portuguese football leagues